This is a list of players, past and present, who have been capped by their country in international football whilst playing for Entente Sportive de Sétif. a further 2 nations have fielded ES Sétif players in their international sides.

Players

Algerien players

Foreign players

Players in international competitions

African Cup Players
  
 
 
1990 African Cup
  Antar Osmani
  Kamel Adjas
  Abdelhakim Serrar
  Hamid Rahmouni

 
1992 African Cup
  Antar Osmani
  Kamel Adjas
  Mohamed Tribèche
 
2004 African Cup
  Farès Fellahi

 
2010 African Cup
  Khaled Lemmouchia
  Slimane Raho
  Abdelkader Laïfaoui
  Faouzi Chaouchi

 
2013 African Cup
  Mohamed Amine Aoudia
 
2015 African Cup
  Benjamin Zé Ondo

World Cup Players

 
World Cup 2010
  Abdelkader Laïfaoui
  Faouzi Chaouchi

Olympic Players

 
1980 Summer Olympics
  Mohamed Rahmani
 
2016 Summer Olympics
  Miloud Rebiaï
  Ryad Kenniche
  Zakaria Haddouche

External links
DzFoot
web.archive.org
National Football Teams

References

ES Sétif
 
ES Sétif international
Association football player non-biographical articles
ES Setif